A teachable moment, in education, is the time at which learning a particular topic or idea becomes possible or easiest.

In education
The concept was popularized by Robert Havighurst in his 1952 book, Human Development and Education. In the context of education theory, Havighurst explained,  
"A developmental task is a task which is learned at a specific point and which makes achievement of succeeding tasks possible. When the timing is right, the ability to learn a particular task will be possible. This is referred to as a 'teachable moment.' It is important to keep in mind that unless the time is right, learning will not occur. Hence, it is important to repeat important points whenever possible so that when a student's teachable moment occurs, s/he can benefit from the knowledge."

The concept pre-dates Havighurst's book, as does the use of the phrase, but he is credited with popularizing it.

The phrase sometimes denotes not a developmental stage, but rather "that moment when a unique, high interest situation arises that lends itself to discussion of a particular topic." It implies "personal engagement" with issues and problems.

These moments can (and often do) come when least expected. Teachers and parents alike can benefit from the use of teachable moments.

Political use

In July 2009, Harvard professor Henry Louis Gates was arrested at his home; the incident garnered media attention throughout the United States.  The mayor of Cambridge, E. Denise Simmons, said that she hoped that the result would be a "teachable moment". U.S. President Barack Obama expressed the same hope as Simmons:

Obama's use of the phrase attracted considerable comment in the American media and blogosphere. Gates himself echoed the same theme, stating, "I told the President that my entire career as an educator has been devoted to racial healing and improved race relations in this country. I am determined that this be a teaching moment."

On July 4, 2011, Glyn Davis, vice-chancellor of the University of Melbourne, used the term in an article in Campus Review, describing the Australian Higher Education Base Funding Review as a rare opportunity to educate a wider public about how public tertiary education is supported. Davis argued that "We (Australian Universities) must show why Australia's public universities returned to the community, many times over, the money spent providing higher education," and that this constituted a teachable moment.

See also

Notes

References

 Festinger, Leon.  (1957).  A Theory of Cognitive Dissonance. Stanford: Stanford University Press. 
 Gladwell, Malcolm. (2002).  The Tipping Point: How Little Things Can Make a Big Difference. Boston: Back Bay. 
 Havighurst, Robert James, (1952).  Human Development and Education. New York: Longmans, Green.

External links
   TeachableMoment.org ( Morningside Center for Teaching Social Responsibility)

English phrases
Heuristics
Teaching